The 1996-97 NCAA College Football Bowl Games post-season schedule followed the 1996 NCAA Division I-A regular football season in college football and contained 18 bowl games. This started with the 4th annual Las Vegas Bowl and ended with the 1997 Sugar Bowl. The Sugar Bowl served as the Bowl Alliance national championship game for the 1996 season and occurred in the Louisiana Superdome in New Orleans. Featuring a rematch between the #1 Florida State Seminoles and the #3 Florida Gators, the Gators reversed the outcome of their regular season game with the Seminoles to capture both the AP and Bowl Alliance championships.

Non-Bowl Alliance bowls

Bowl Alliance games

Final rankings

AP Poll
1. Florida
2. Ohio State
3. Florida State
4. Arizona State
5. BYU
6. Nebraska
7. Penn State
8. Colorado
9. Tennessee
10. North Carolina
11. Alabama
12. LSU
13. Virginia Tech
14. Miami (FL)
15. Northwestern
16. Washington
17. Kansas State
18. Iowa
19. Notre Dame
20. Michigan
21. Syracuse
22. Wyoming
23. Texas
24. Auburn
25. Army

Coaches' Poll
1. Florida
2. Ohio State
3. Florida State
4. Arizona State
5. BYU
6. Nebraska
7. Penn State
8. Colorado
9. Tennessee
10. North Carolina
11. Alabama
12. Virginia Tech
13. LSU
14. Miami (FL)
15. Washington
16. Northwestern
17. Kansas State
18. Iowa
19. Syracuse
20. Michigan
21. Notre Dame
22. Wyoming
23. Texas
24. Auburn
25. Army